The Abdullah Frères (French for "Abdullah Brothers") were a group of three Ottoman brothers of Armenian descent, Viçen Abdullahyan (1820–1902), Hovsep Abdullahyan (1830–1908), and Kevork Abdullahyan (1839–1918), photographers of international fame during the late Ottoman Empire. They took pictures of scenic views and notable individuals, including sultans. Most of their photography was taken in the Ottoman Empire.

Viçen (later known as Abdullah Şükrü after converting to Islam) began his photographic career touching up photos for Rabach, who opened his photography studio in 1856 in the Bayezid district of Constantinople. In 1858, when Viçen's younger brother Kevork returned from his studies at the Murad Raphaelian Armenian Academy in Venice, they and another brother, Hovsep, decided to take over Rabach's photography studio and open their own, called the Abdullah Frères. In 1867, they sold their shop in Beyazid and moved to a more favorable location in Pera. The Abdullah Frères subsequently were among the most famous photographers in the Ottoman Empire. In 1863, Sultan Abdulaziz declared the Abdullah Frères as the official court photographers and Outstanding Artists of the City, an epithet they used until the closure of the shop in 1899. In 1886, at the request of the Khedive in Egypt, they opened a branch in Cairo, Egypt.

Over their lengthy career, the Abdullah Frères photographed numerous Ottoman sultans, Ottoman statesmen such as Ibrahim Edhem Pasha and Osman Nuri Pasha, international figures such as Mark Twain, scenic views, and more.

Gallery

References

External links

Mark Twain (Samuel Clemens) Signed Photo by Abdullah Frères, Constantinople 1867 Shapell Manuscript Foundation

Ethnic Armenian photographers
Armenians from the Ottoman Empire
Photographers from Istanbul
Sibling trios
Families from the Ottoman Empire
19th-century photographers
20th-century photographers